Viscount Severn is a title in the Peerage of the United Kingdom. The name of the viscountcy is derived from the River Severn that runs through England and Wales. The title, along with the Earldom of Wessex, was bestowed on Prince Edward by his mother, Queen Elizabeth II, upon his marriage to Sophie Rhys-Jones. Between 1999 and 2023, the title was a subsidiary title of the Earldom of Wessex and Earldom of Forfar. Since 2023, the title is a subsidiary title of the Dukedom of Edinburgh upon the granting of the dukedom to Prince Edward.

History 
Viscount Severn was used by minor members of the royal family in the 18th century. There is a history of being given a secondary title so the eldest son can have it as a courtesy title.

The title Viscount Severn is derived from the Welsh roots of Sophie Rhys-Jones's family. The significance of this title is that it alludes to her ancestors having ruled the land Between Wye and Severn. This was the first time a royal prince was granted a viscountcy since 1726 when the title was given to two of George II’s sons.

First creation, 1999

| Prince EdwardHouse of Windsor1999–presentalso: Duke of Edinburgh (2023), Earl of Wessex (1999), Earl of Forfar (2019)
| 
| 10 March 1964Buckingham Palace, Londonson of Queen Elizabeth II and Prince Philip
| 19 June 1999Sophie Rhys-Jones2 children
|  now  old
|-
|}

Line of succession

  Prince Edward, Duke of Edinburgh (b. 1964)
 (1)  James, Earl of Wessex (b. 2007)

References

British monarchy
Viscountcies in the Peerage of the United Kingdom
Noble titles created in 1999
1999 establishments in the United Kingdom
Prince Edward, Earl of Wessex